The Gamboa Coffee Spikers is a professional men's volleyball team playing in the Premier Volleyball League based in San Juan, Metro Manila, Philippines.
The team is owned by Universal Knowledge DermPharma.

Current roster 

 

Coaching staff
 Head Coach: Mario Mia
 Assistant Coach: John Pat de Guzman

Team Staff
 Team Manager:
 Team Utility: 

Medical Staff
 Team Physician:
 Physical Therapist:

Previous roster 

For the Premier Volleyball League 1st Season Open Conference:
 

Coaching staff
 Head Coach: Mario Mia
 Assistant Coach(s): John Pat de Guzman

Team Staff
 Team Manager:
 Team Utility: 

Medical Staff
 Team Physician:
 Physical Therapist:

Honors

Team 
Premier Volleyball League

Individual 
Premier Volleyball League

Team Captains
  Sam Damian

Coaches
  Mario Mia

References

Men's volleyball teams in the Philippines
Sports teams in Metro Manila
Volleyball clubs established in 2017
2017 establishments in the Philippines